Bachia barbouri, also known commonly as Barbour's bachia, is a species of lizard in the family Gymnophthalmidae. The species is endemic to  Peru.

Etymology
The specific name, barbouri, is in honor of American herpetologist Thomas Barbour.

Geographic range
B. barbouri is found in northwestern Peru, in the valleys of the Río Chinchipe, the Río Marañón, and the Río Utcubamba.

Habitat
The preferred natural habitat of B. barbouri is forest.

Description
The legs are much reduced. The front leg is short, with only two digits. The back leg is either a small tubercle or is absent.

Reproduction
B. barbouri is oviparous.

References

Further reading
Brongersma LD (1946). "Some notes on species of the genera Bachia and Scolecosaurus ". Zoologische Mededelingen 26 (5): 237–246. (Bachia barbouri, pp. 243–244, Figure 4).
Burt CE, Burt MD (1931). "South American Lizards in the Collection of the American Museum of Natural History". Bulletin of the American Museum of Natural History 61 (7): 227–395. (Bachia barbouri, new species, pp. 318–320, Figures 5–8).
Koch C, Venegas PJ, Santa Cruz R, Böhme W (2018). "Annotated checklist and key to the species of amphibians and reptiles inhabiting the northern Peruvian dry forest along the Andean valley of the Marañón River and its tributaries". Zootaxa 4385 (1): 1–101.

Bachia
Reptiles described in 1931
Reptiles of Peru
Endemic fauna of Peru
Taxa named by Charles Earle Burt
Taxa named by May Danheim Burt